Psamathocrita albidella is a moth of the family Gelechiidae. It was described by Rebel in 1903. It is found in the Sahara.

The wingspan is about 12 mm. The forewings are white with some black scales, forming a small marking at three-fourths. The hindwings are greyish-white.

References

Moths described in 1903
Psamathocrita